Now Larimar Punta Cana is a resort located on Bavaro Beach Punta Cana, Dominican Republic. It was opened in late 2007. The resort sits on Bavaro Beach, which shares many other resort hotels. The resort, formally known as the EdenH Real Arena Resort, is operated by Now Resorts.

Rooms

There are 658 rooms. There are three types of rooms- Deluxe Rooms, Paradise Club Rooms, and 38 suites. The rooms are located in two parallel buildings that each have four floors.

Facilities

Facilities include five swimming pools, six restaurants, eight bars, one casino, a spa, Kids Club, Teens Club, gym and exercise center, Internet Lounge, basketball courts, two tennis courts, volleyball courts on the pool and beach, bowling lanes, life-size chess games at the pool, conference and banquet facilities for up to 700 people, dry cleaning & laundry facilities, and lounge chairs available at the beach and pools.

References

External links
Now Larimar Punta Cana Official Website
Trip Advisor Review Page

Hotels in the Dominican Republic
Hotel buildings completed in 2007
Hotels established in 2007
Buildings and structures in La Altagracia Province
Tourist attractions in La Altagracia Province
Resorts in the Dominican Republic